Raphael Selbourne (born 1968 in Oxford, England) is a British writer.  His debut novel Beauty was awarded the 2009 Costa First Novel Award and the McKitterick Prize in 2010.

Background 

Born in Oxford, his father is political commentator David Selbourne. He grew up in Oxford and studied Politics at the University of Sussex before moving to Italy. He lived in the West Midlands for many years, the setting for his debut novel Beauty.

Bibliography

External links 
 Profile and interview in The Times
 Extract from Beauty featured in The Guardian newspaper
 Review of Beauty in The View From Here
 Interview in The Independent
 Tindal Street Press

References 

1968 births
Living people
Alumni of the University of Sussex
British writers
Writers from Oxford